Wolf Like Me may refer to:
 Wolf Like Me (song), a song by TV on the Radio
 Wolf Like Me (TV series), an American streaming TV series